Daemisan (hangul:대미산; hanja:大美山) is the name of two mountains in South Korea:

 Daemisan (North Gyeongsang/North Chungcheong), 1,115m, in Mungyeong of Gyeongsangbuk-do, and Jecheon of Chungcheongbuk-do
 Daemisan (Gangwon), 1,243.4m, Pyeongchang